Woodford is an unincorporated community in Kern County, California. It is located on the railroad 1 mile (1.6 km) southeast of Keene, at an elevation of 2746 feet (837 m).

References 

Unincorporated communities in Kern County, California
Unincorporated communities in California